Myeloid zinc finger 1 is a protein that in humans is encoded by the MZF1 gene.

Interactions 

MZF1 has been shown to interact with SCAND1.
In 2014, the laboratory of Nathan H. Lents showed that MZF-1 induces the GAPDH gene, something that must be considered when GAPDH is used as a loading control in experiments that may induce or perturb MZF-1. The same group later showed that MZF-1 induces CTGF and NOV, two members of the CCN gene family.

References

Further reading